The Grindelwald–Männlichen gondola cableway is a gondola cableway linking Grindelwald with Männlichen. It is owned and operated by the Gondelbahn Grindelwald–Männlichen AG.

The Grindelwald–Männlichen gondola cableway was the longest passenger-carrying gondola cableway in the world when it opened in 1978.

History
The cableway was proposed in order to provide direct access the snow-sure and wind-sheltered Männlichen ski region and thus extend the ski season into spring. It was also felt that it would create interesting new round-trips and hiking attractions.

The company was founded in 1978, and the cableway opened in 1978. The cableway was constructed by Habegger Maschinenfabrik AG, at a cost of CHF 22 million. At the time of its building, it was world’s longest aerial gondola cableway.

The gondola is due to be replaced in 2019 by the V-cableway and a new 10-passenger gondola built and designed Doppelmayr and paid for by Jungfraubahn AG.

Operations
The cableway is constructed in two sections, and there is an intermediate station at Holenstein where the gondolas change cable. The journey time from Grindelwald to Männlichen is 30 minutes.

Connections
It is a 3-minute walk from the Gondelbahn base station at Grindelwald to the Wengernalp railway's Grindelwald Grund station. It is a 4-minute walk from the Gondelbahn top station at Männlichen to the Wengen–Männlichen aerial cableway.

References

External links
 
 Grindelwald–Männlichen gondola cableway official web site

Cable cars in Switzerland
Bernese Oberland
Gondola lifts
Grindelwald
Transport in the canton of Bern